The BYU Cougars softball program began its first year in 2000. The current coach is Gordon Eakin who is in his 20th season coaching the BYU Cougars softball team.

History
The BYU Cougars softball team has been to 15 straight NCAA Tournament appearances and 16 total entering the 2020 season. In 2014 the Cougars became the only team to have won four conference championships from four different conferences in four consecutive years; 2011 Mountain West Conference, 2012 Western Athletic Conference, 2013 Pacific Coast Softball Conference, and 2014 West Coast Conference. The Cougars softball field is the fourth largest on-campus NCAA softball facility.

Stadium
Gail Miller Field is the home of the BYU Cougars softball team. The field is part of the Larry H. Miller Sports Complex and is located directly behind Larry H. Miller Field.

Results by season

References